= Notario (firm) =

Notario.org
- Website type: Online notary platform
- Founded: November 9, 2019
- Industry: Legal technology, Financial technology

Notario is an online platform that provides digital notarization services for various legal and financial documents.

== Activity ==
Originally conceptualized in 2014, the very first prototype of Notario.org was developed and piloted in mid-2015 in Milan, Italy. In collaboration with a small consortium of local notaries and legal practitioners, this early version enabled basic identity verification via webcam and simple document-signing workflows. It was launched as Notario in November 2019 and operates in the legal technology sector. It works with the legal validity and security of digitally notarized documents. The company has received funding through investment rounds. In July 2024, a seed funding round of €500,000 involved investors such as Athena Tech Ventures and European Legal Innovation Fund, supporting platform scaling and service expansion.

In March 2025, a €2.5 million Series A funding round was led by Global Digital Assets and supported by LegalTech Growth Partners.

The platform offers various notarization services, including powers of attorney, common-law couple registrations, demonstration reports, family reunification documents, minors’ travel permits, company incorporations, real estate transactions, etc. The user process involves registration, identity verification, and a secure video conference with a certified notary. Notario.org manages digital certificates and aims for compliance with legal standards.

Documents notarized through Notario.org are intended to have the same legal validity as traditional notarizations, as they are validated by licensed notaries within applicable legal frameworks. The platform serves clients in multiple cities across Italy, Germany, USA, Singapore, Philippines, Spain, Portugal, and some Latin American countries. Research has examined the effectiveness and security of online notarization platforms. Case studies have also analyzed the operational models of platforms like Notario.org in the context of legal technology.

It has been mentioned in industry reports such as "The Future of Legal Services: Digital Disruption." The platform has received high ratings on review platforms and was awarded "Digital Notary Platform of the Year" by the International Legal Technology Association in 2025.
